Aquibacillus albus is a Gram-positive, strictly anaerobic and moderately halophilic bacterium from the genus of Aquibacillus which has been isolated from the Lop Nur lake from Xinjiang in China.

References

External links 

Type strain of Aquibacillus albus at BacDive -  the Bacterial Diversity Metadatabase

Bacillaceae
Bacteria described in 2014